Agustine Limanto (born 4 August 1978) is an Indonesian-Singaporean former professional tennis player.

Limanto, who had a best ranking of 580 in the world, appeared in two WTA Tour singles main draws, both in her native Indonesia. She debuted as a lucky loser at the 1995 Wismilak Open and featured as a wildcard entry at the 1996 Danamon Open. Her best ranking in doubles was 429 and she won one ITF doubles title.

After being granted Singaporean permanent residency in December 2000, Limanto played Fed Cup tennis for Singapore over the next two years, competing on Asia/Oceania Zone Group II. She had a 2/5 overall career record, with both of her two wins in singles rubbers.

ITF finals

Doubles: 2 (1–1)

References

External links
 
 
 

1978 births
Living people
Indonesian female tennis players
Singaporean female tennis players
Indonesian emigrants to Singapore